Marin-Epagnier railway station is a railway station in the municipality of La Tène, in the Swiss canton of Neuchâtel. It is an intermediate stop on the standard gauge Bern–Neuchâtel line of BLS AG.

Services 
 the following services stop at Marin-Epagnier:

References

External links 
 
 

Railway stations in the canton of Neuchâtel
BLS railway stations